In mathematics (specifically linear algebra), the Woodbury matrix identity, named after Max A. Woodbury, says that the inverse of a rank-k correction of some matrix can be computed by doing a rank-k correction to the inverse of the original matrix. Alternative names for this formula are the matrix inversion lemma, Sherman–Morrison–Woodbury formula or just Woodbury formula. However, the identity appeared in several papers before the Woodbury report.

The Woodbury matrix identity is

where A, U, C and V are conformable matrices: A is n×n, C is k×k, U is n×k,  and V is k×n. This can be derived using blockwise matrix inversion.

While the identity is primarily used on matrices, it holds in a general ring or in an Ab-category.

Discussion 
To prove this result, we will start by proving a simpler one.

This identity itself can be viewed as the combination of two simpler identities. We obtain the first identity from
 ,
thus,
 ,
and similarly
 
The second identity is the so-called push-through identity
 
that we obtain from
 

Special cases 

When  are vectors, the identity reduces to the Sherman–Morrison formula.

In the scalar case, the reduced version is simply

Inverse of a sum 

If n = k and U = V = In is the identity matrix, then

Continuing with the merging of the terms of the far right-hand side of the above equation results in Hua's identity

Another useful form of the same identity is

which, unlike those above, is valid even if  is singular, and has a recursive structure that yields

This form can be used in perturbative expansions where B is a perturbation of A.

Variations

Binomial inverse theorem 

If A, B, U, V are matrices of sizes n×n, k×k, n×k, k×n, respectively, then

provided A and B + BVA−1UB are nonsingular. Nonsingularity of the latter requires that B−1 exist since it equals  and the rank of the latter cannot exceed the rank of B.

A variation for when B is singular and possibly even non-square:

Formulas also exist for certain cases in which A is singular.

Pseudoinverse with positive semidefinite matrices 

In general Woodbury's identity is not valid if one or more inverses are replaced by (Moore–Penrose) pseudoinverses.

Derivations

Direct proof 
The formula can be proven by checking that  times its alleged inverse on the right side of the Woodbury identity gives the identity matrix:

Alternative proofs 

First consider these useful identities,
 

Now, 
 

Deriving the Woodbury matrix identity is easily done by solving the following block matrix inversion problem

Expanding, we can see that the above reduces to

Eliminating the first equation, we find that , which can be substituted into the second to find . Finally, we substitute into our , and we have . Thus,

We have derived the Woodbury matrix identity.

We start by the matrix

By eliminating the entry under the A (given that A is invertible) we get

Likewise, eliminating the entry above C gives

Now combining the above two, we get

Moving to the right side gives

which is the LDU decomposition of the block matrix into an upper triangular, diagonal, and lower triangular matrices.

Now inverting both sides gives

 

We could equally well have done it the other way (provided that C is invertible) i.e.

 

Now again inverting both sides,
 

Now comparing elements (1, 1) of the RHS of (1) and (2) above gives the Woodbury formula

Applications 

This identity is useful in certain numerical computations where A−1 has already been computed and it is desired to compute (A + UCV)−1.  With the inverse of A available, it is only necessary to find the inverse of C−1 + VA−1U in order to obtain the result using the right-hand side of the identity.  If C has a much smaller dimension than A, this is more efficient than inverting A + UCV directly. A common case is finding the inverse of a low-rank update A + UCV of A (where U only has a few columns and V only a few rows), or finding an approximation of the inverse of the matrix A + B where the matrix B can be approximated by a low-rank matrix UCV, for example using the singular value decomposition.

This is applied, e.g., in the Kalman filter and recursive least squares methods, to replace the parametric solution, requiring inversion of a state vector sized matrix, with a condition equations based solution. In case of the Kalman filter this matrix has the dimensions of the vector of observations, i.e., as small as 1 in case only one new observation is processed at a time. This significantly speeds up the often real time calculations of the filter.

In the case when C is the identity matrix I, the matrix  is known in numerical linear algebra and numerical partial differential equations as the capacitance matrix.

See also
Sherman–Morrison formula
Schur complement
Matrix determinant lemma, formula for a rank-k update to a determinant
Invertible matrix
Moore–Penrose pseudoinverse#Updating the pseudoinverse

Notes

External links 
 Some matrix identities
 

Lemmas in linear algebra
Matrices
Matrix theory